The Roman Catholic Diocese of Albany covers 14 counties in Eastern New York (Albany, Columbia, Delaware, Fulton, Greene, southern Herkimer, Montgomery, Otsego, Rensselaer, Saratoga, Schenectady, Schoharie, Warren, and Washington Counties), including the south west corner of a 15th county (Hamilton). Its Mother Church is the Cathedral of the Immaculate Conception in the city of Albany.

History

When St. Mary's Church was formally established in downtown Albany in 1796, it was the only Catholic church upstate and the second Catholic church in the state, after St. Peter's in New York. The parish was part of the Diocese of Baltimore, until 1808 when the Diocese of New York was erected.

In 1817, Irish immigrants began coming to Albany to build the Erie Canal. The industry that grew around the canal terminus attracted even more immigrants, and the Catholics among them began settling not just in Albany but elsewhere in the Capital District and Mohawk Valley, establishing new churches. Immigration from Ireland rose even more in the 1840s due to the Great Famine. By 1847, the Catholic Church and its congregations were well entrenched in Albany and the other cities of the region, and Pope Pius IX granted requests to establish the Diocese of Albany. John McCloskey, later Archbishop of New York, was installed as the first bishop of Albany in 1847, with St. Mary's as his procathedral. At that time, the diocese covered , containing 60,000 Catholics, 25 churches, 34 priests, 2 orphanages, and 2 free schools.

The Cathedral of the Immaculate Conception was dedicated in 1852, and it opened for services thereafter. On the 50th anniversary of the cathedral's opening, it was formally consecrated by Bishop Thomas Burke.

McCloskey was succeeded by his vicar general, John J. Conroy who increased the number of priests in the diocese, securing the services of the Augustinians and the Conventual Franciscans. His successor, Francis McNeirny secured the services of the Dominican Tertiaries, Sisters of the Good Shepherd, and Redemptorist Fathers for the diocese.

Bishop Thomas Cusack established Catholic Charities in the diocese. Edmund Gibbons established The College of Saint Rose, Siena College, Mater Christi Seminary, 22 high schools, 82 grade schools, and the diocesan newspaper, The Evangelist. William Scully headed the New York State Catholic Welfare Committee and the Catholic Charities division of the National Catholic Welfare Council.

Howard Hubbard became Bishop of Albany in 1977. Hubbard is the first native of the diocese to hold that position. His interest in ecumenism led to the first-ever Palm Sunday service of reconciliation between Christians and Jews, held at the cathedral in 1986. At the service, called "From Fear to Friendship" and attended by approximately 1,200 guests, both Christian and Jewish, Hubbard "expressed contrition and remorse for the centuries of anti-Jewish hostility promulgated under the Church's auspices". Portal, a sculpture that stands just west of the building, commemorates the event.

The diocese of Albany has given priests the permission to celebrate the Traditional Latin Mass since 1999. In June 2019, the diocese celebrated the 20th anniversary of the extraordinary form mass in the Albany diocese at a mass at St. Mary's Church.

As of December 2016, there were 350,000 Catholics in the diocese.

In September 2019, people affiliated with the now-closed St. Clare's Hospital in Schenectady, New York sued the Diocese, alleging that their pensions had gone unpaid.

On March 15, 2023, the diocese filed for Chapter 11 bankruptcy.

Cathedral of the Immaculate Conception

At the first retreat he presided over, Bishop John McCloskey persuaded the assembled priests to pledge over five thousand dollars as the seed of a building fund. He commissioned Patrick Keely, an Irish immigrant himself, to design the Cathedral of the Immaculate Conception. Over 10,000 watched on a rainy July day in 1848 as the church's cornerstone was laid. The final construction cost was $250,000 ($ in modern dollars). The cathedral was dedicated in 1852, and it opened for services thereafter.

By 1858, the money was available to add a spire. The north tower was completed in 1862. Its  height made it the city's tallest building for many years. Bells cast at the Meneely Bell Foundry in nearby West Troy (today Watervliet) were hung in the belfry and rung for the first time on the Feast of the Immaculate Conception, December 8, 1862. The diocese was able to build the south tower's spire in 1888 and, four years later, the apse and sacristies. In 1902, on the 50th anniversary of the cathedral's opening, it was formally consecrated by Bishop Thomas Burke.

In the 1920s, New York elected a Catholic, Al Smith, governor, the first one to be elected to that position in the history of the state. Living in the governor's mansion next door, he became a regular parishioner at the cathedral. In 1928, the year Smith ran unsuccessfully for president, his daughter Catherine was married in the cathedral.

Following years of deterioration, the Cathedral underwent a restoration process in the 21st century. After $19 million total had been spent, the cathedral was reopened in 2010 and rededicated on its 158th anniversary later that year. A thousand people attended the Mass celebrated by Hubbard along with his New York counterpart, Timothy Dolan, and Dolan's predecessor, Cardinal Edward Egan. Many who attended were impressed with the restoration, particularly the return of the original paint.

Clergy abuse scandal
In 2004, the Diocese of Albany reported that 19 priests had committed acts of sexual abuse in the past 53 years, and that investigations were pending into allegations involving 10 current and former priests. In February 2004, Bishop Hubbard was accused of having engaged in homosexual activity with two different men in the 1970s. Hubbard denied the accusations and asserted that he had never broken his vow of celibacy. At the request of the Diocese of Albany, the accusations against Hubbard were investigated by former U.S. Attorney Mary Jo White. In June 2004, White released a 200-page report stating that she had found no credible evidence to support the accusations against Hubbard.

On March 19, 2011, Bishop Howard Hubbard placed three retired priests on administrative leave and removed another from the ministry after receiving allegations of child sexual abuse. That same year, the Diocese of Albany created the Independent Mediation Assistance Program; this program allowed persons who were abused by diocesan priests or employees as minors to request and obtain financial assistance. Hubbard later acknowledged that the past practice of the Diocese was to send clergy offenders for treatment and counselling in privacy, rather than to involve the criminal justice system; he expressed regret for that practice.

On February 14, 2019, New York Gov. Andrew Cuomo signed the Child Victims Act. This law created a one-year lookback period in which civil lawsuits could be filed based on previously time-barred claims of child sex abuse. In August 2019, numerous sex abuse lawsuits were filed against the Diocese of Albany. Among those accused in the lawsuits was the retired Bishop Hubbard, who took a leave of absence from active ministry in August 2019 shortly after the lawsuits were made public; Hubbard has denied the allegations against him.

By March 2020, roughly 80 priests who served in the Diocese of Albany had been accused of committing acts of sex abuse. On May 8, 2020, Gov. Andrew Cuomo signed a bill extending the lookback period contained in the Child Victims Act to January 14, 2021. In June 2020, it was revealed that 52 new sex abuse lawsuits had been filed against the Diocese of Albany.

Priest shortage
In 1960, there were more than 400 priests in the diocese. In 2016, for the first time in history, there were more retired (90) than active (85) priests in the diocese. In 2021, in the northern part of the diocese, one priest was pastor of 12 parishes.

Parishes

As of May 2021, there were 126 parishes in the Diocese of Albany.

Territorial losses

Bishops

Bishops of Albany
 John McCloskey (1847-1864), appointed Coadjutor Bishop of New York and subsequently succeeded to see (elevated to Cardinal in 1875) 
 John J. Conroy (1865-1877)
 Francis McNeirny (1877-1894; coadjutor bishop 1871-1877)
 Thomas Martin Aloysius Burke (1894-1915)
 Thomas Cusack (1915-1918)
 Edmund Gibbons (1919-1954)
 William Scully (1954-1969; coadjutor bishop 1945-1954)
 Edwin Broderick (1969-1976)
 Howard J. Hubbard (1977-2014)
 Edward Bernard Scharfenberger (2014–present)

Former auxiliary bishop
 Edward Joseph Maginn (1957-1972)

Other priests of this diocese who became bishops
 Francis Patrick McFarland, appointed Bishop of Hartford in 1858
 Edgar Philip Prindle Wadhams, appointed Bishop of Ogdensburg in 1872
 Patrick Anthony Ludden, appointed Bishop of Syracuse in 1886
 John Joseph Thomas Ryan, appointed Archbishop of Anchorage in 1966 and later Archbishop for the Military Services, USA
 Matthew Harvey Clark, appointed Bishop of Rochester in 1979
 Harry Joseph Flynn, appointed Coadjutor Bishop of Lafayette in Louisiana in 1986 (later succeeded to see) and later Coadjutor Archbishop and Archbishop of Saint Paul and Minneapolis
 John Gavin Nolan, appointed Auxiliary Bishop for the Military Services, USA in 1987
 Joseph Walter Estabrook, appointed Auxiliary Bishop for the Military Services, USA in 2004

During their terms as bishops of Albany, the first five named were accorded the title "Right Reverend" because the American church was still considered a province. From Bishop Gibbons on, they have been entitled "Most Reverend". John McCloskey was "Most Reverend" after his move to New York, where he later became "His Eminence". Six of Albany's deceased Bishops are buried in a crypt beneath the Cathedral of the Immaculate Conception.

Education

Enrollment data for the 2019-2020 and 2020-2021 school year was obtained from New York State Department of Education Non-Public Enrollment. Enrollment data for the 2021-2022 school year was obtained from the New York State COVID-19 School Report.

*In November 2021, the Diocese of Albany announced that Catholic Central High School would close its Troy, NY campus and merge with St. Ambrose School in Latham, NY, creating a K-12 regional campus at the St. Ambrose location.

Shrines 
 National Shrine of the North American Martyrs, Auriesville
 National Shrine of St. Kateri Tekawitha, Fonda

See also

 Index of Catholic Church articles
 List of the Catholic dioceses of the United States
 List of Roman Catholic archdioceses (by country and continent)
 List of Roman Catholic dioceses (alphabetical) (including archdioceses)
 List of Roman Catholic dioceses (structured view) (including archdioceses)

References

External links
Roman Catholic Diocese of Albany Official Site

 
Albany
Albany
Albany
Companies that filed for Chapter 11 bankruptcy in 2023
1847 establishments in New York (state)
Organizations based in Albany, New York